Jennifer Holness is a Jamaican-born Canadian film and television director, producer and screenwriter. She operates Hungry Eyes Media Inc., along with her business partner and husband Sudz Sutherland. Her production and writing credits include the film Subjects of Desire, Love, Sex and Eating the Bones and the television series Guns, She's the Mayor and Shoot the Messenger.

Holness also directed the documentary film Speakers for the Dead, and produced Catherine Annau's documentary film Brick by Brick.

Biography 
Jennifer Holness was born in 1969 in Montego Bay, Jamaica. She moved to Toronto, Canada, at a young age with her mother. She attended York University, where she studied political science. This is also where she met her husband David "Sudz" Sutherland. The two were married after finishing their degrees at York University and have three daughters.

Career 
Holness has mentioned that growing up in a housing project helped shape her view of the city and how she crafts her work. The aim of her work has been a steady understanding of the stories that most people do not want to direct; touching subjects about gun violence, homophobia and deportation of immigrants in the city of Toronto. Holness' professional career started with a documentary in which she co-directed, Speakers for the Dead (2000) with her husband, Sutherland. Following the success from Love, Sex And Eating the Bones, Holness produced and co-wrote a miniseries for CBC titled Guns (2009). She then went on to produce a documentary, Badge of Pride (2010), which looked at the struggles that gay police officers faced in the force. Holness went on to produce and co-write another feature film titled Home Again (2012), in which follows Jamaican deportees from Canada. Holness mentions that she obtained the inspiration for this film from a classmate in high school who was deported back to Jamaica- and killed in a shooting. It was in an attempt to challenge the bill C-43 which stated that immigrants with criminal records could be deported back to native countries.  Her largest work to date with husband David Sutherland with a production value of over 4 million.

She produced and co-wrote the TV crime drama, Shoot the Messenger (2016), a drama that follows a journalist who gets tied up with various third-parties (such as gangs and politicians) while she uncovers her first murder case. The idea was loosely based on the controversies of former Toronto mayor Rob Ford.

In 2021, her documentary film Subjects of Desire (2021) premiered at SXSW competing in the Documentary Feature Competition.

Awards and nominations

Filmography

References

External links

Living people
Canadian documentary film producers
Canadian television producers
Canadian women television producers
20th-century Canadian screenwriters
Canadian television writers
Canadian documentary film directors
Canadian women screenwriters
Black Canadian writers
Black Canadian women
Canadian women film producers
Canadian Film Centre alumni
Canadian women documentary filmmakers
Canadian women television writers
Year of birth missing (living people)
Black Canadian filmmakers
20th-century Canadian women writers
21st-century Canadian screenwriters
21st-century Canadian women writers
Film producers from Ontario
Canadian film production company founders